The Girl of the Golden West is a 1930 American Pre-Code Western film produced and distributed by First National Pictures, a subsidiary of Warner Bros., directed by John Francis Dillon and starring actress Ann Harding and James Rennie. Harding's then-husband, Harry Bannister, plays the villain Jack Rance. David Belasco wrote, directed, and produced the original play in 1905 which starred Blanche Bates.

Two previous silent film versions of the play were made, one by Cecil B. DeMille in 1915 and another starring Sylvia Breamer in 1923. More famously, Belasco's play was filmed yet again in 1938 as a musical with operetta duo Jeanette MacDonald and Nelson Eddy.

Cinematographer Sol Polito also worked on the 1923 silent version.

Plot
Minnie (Harding) runs the Polka saloon during the days of the California Gold Rush in California, and lives on the money brought in by the drinking and gambling at her establishment. She is highly respected by the miners who live in the area and they protect her and see to it that no harm comes her way. Minnie falls in love with Dick Johnson (Rennie), who mysteriously rides into town one day. Minnie does not know that he is a notorious road agent who is being sought after by the agents of the Wells Fargo express. Instead, Minnie believes that Johnson is a miner.

Jack Rance (Banister) is a sheriff in love with Minnie, but who is rejected by her. Johnson plans to rob the Polka saloon, which serves as a depository for the miner's gold dust; however, he drops his plans to rob the saloon as he becomes attracted to Minnie and falls in love with her. Rance finds out that Johnson is staying with Minnie and heads out to the saloon to arrest him. Minnie denies that Johnson is with her and while he attempts to escape from the saloon, he is spotted and wounded. He manages to escape, however, and Minnie shelters him again once the sheriff has left.

The sheriff comes back once again and Minnie again denies that Johnson is there. Johnson, who is still bleeding, is hiding on the rafters near the ceiling and when drops of blood fall to the floor the sheriff realizes that Minnie has been lying. Minnie then challenges the sheriff to a poker game for Johnson's freedom, as well as her own, and wins, much to the chagrin of the sheriff. Vigilantes approach the saloon and demand that Johnson surrender himself to be hanged. He is given a few moments to say goodbye to Minnie after which he attempts to shoot himself. The vigilantes finally relent after Minnie's pleading and allow Johnson and Minnie to escape. The film ends as we see them on their journey to begin a new life together.

Cast
 Ann Harding as Minnie
 James Rennie as Dick Johnson
 Harry Bannister as Jack Rance
 Ben Hendricks Jr. as Handsome Charlie
 J. Farrell MacDonald as Sonora Slim
 George Cooper as Trinidad Joe
 Johnnie Walker as Nick
 Richard Carlyle as Jim Larkins
 Arthur Stone as Joe Castro
 Arthur Housman as Sidney Dick
 Norman McNeil as Happy Holiday
 Fred Warren as Jack Wallace
 Joseph W. Girard as Ashby

Preservation
No film elements are known to survive. The soundtrack, which was recorded on Vitaphone disks, may survive in private hands.

See also
 List of American films of 1930

References

External links
 
 
 
 
 Flyer

1930 films
1930 Western (genre) films
Films directed by John Francis Dillon
American films based on plays
First National Pictures films
1930s English-language films
Films about the California Gold Rush
Warner Bros. films
American black-and-white films
American Western (genre) films
Remakes of American films
Sound film remakes of silent films
Films produced by Robert North
1930 drama films
1930s American films